The huiringua, kuiringua, kiringua,  quiringua, cuiringua is a percussion instrument of the group of slit drums. It consists of a hollow log with closed ends with a slit along the instrument.
The shell becomes the resonating chamber for the sound vibrations created when the slit is  struck with a pair of wood mallets.

References

External links
 Photo of huiringua

Mexican musical instruments
Slit drums